Saraswati Pradhan (born 30 May 1925) is an Indian former politician. She was elected to the Rajya Sabha the Upper house of Indian Parliament from Odisha as a member of the Indian National Congress. As of January 2018, Pradhan resided in Bhubaneswar.

References

1925 births
Living people
Biju Janata Dal politicians
Rajya Sabha members from Odisha
Members of the Odisha Legislative Assembly
Women in Odisha politics
Indian National Congress politicians from Odisha
20th-century Indian women politicians
20th-century Indian politicians
Women members of the Rajya Sabha